Jack Graham may refer to:

Sportspeople
Jack Graham (Australian footballer, born 1916) (1916–1984), Australian rules footballer for South Melbourne
Jack Graham (Australian footballer, born 1878) (1878–1907), Australian rules footballer for Melbourne
Jack Graham (Australian footballer, born 1998), Australian rules footballer for Richmond
Jack Graham (footballer, born 1868) (1868–1932), English footballer
Jack Graham (footballer, born 1873) (1873–1925), English footballer
Jack Graham (baseball) (1916–1998), Major League Baseball player

Others
Jack Gilbert Graham (1932–1957), mass murderer
Jack Graham (pastor) (born 1950), Baptist pastor and former president of the Southern Baptist Convention
Jack Graham (politician) (born 1952), American politician and businessman

See also
John Graham (disambiguation)